Mauro Milciades Monges (born 17 February 1983 in Asunción, Paraguay) is a Paraguayan footballer who plays for Pacífico FC of the Primera División in Perú.

Teams
  Sportivo San Lorenzo 2002
  Guaraní 2003
  Nacional 2004
  Rosario Central 2005
  Nacional 2006-2007
  Atlético Tembetary 2007
  Olimpia 2008
  2 de Mayo 2009
  Deportivo Caaguazú 2009–2010
  2 de Mayo 2011–2013
  Pacífico FC 2013–present

References
 
 

1983 births
Living people
Paraguayan footballers
Paraguayan expatriate footballers
Club Guaraní players
Club Olimpia footballers
Club Nacional footballers
Rosario Central footballers
Argentine Primera División players
Expatriate footballers in Peru
Expatriate footballers in Argentina
Association footballers not categorized by position